Korea National University of Welfare is a national university located in Pyeongtaek, South Korea.

See also
List of national universities in South Korea
List of universities and colleges in South Korea
Education in Korea

References

External links 
 University website

Pyeongtaek
National universities and colleges in South Korea
Universities and colleges in Gyeonggi Province
Educational institutions established in 2002
2002 establishments in South Korea